M.J. Soffe LLC, better known as Soffe (pronounced SO-Fee), is a brand name of apparel for youth and adults, specifically producing sportswear. It was founded in 1946 by M.J. Soffe. A common brand used by cheerleaders, Soffe produces shorts that are worn primarily by females; however, they used to be standard-issue for junior/senior high school and college P.E. classes for both boys and girls.

In 2012, the United States Marine Corps ended its licensing agreement deal with Soffe after order and design documentation for clothes bearing Marine logos was found in a burned out clothing factory in Bangladesh.

Soffe is headquartered in Fayetteville, North Carolina and is a wholly owned subsidiary of Delta Apparel Inc. Soffe products are sold in sporting good retailers and department stores. Soffe distribution centers include Miramar, Florida, Santa Fe Springs, California, Lansing, Michigan, Cranbury, New Jersey, and at the company's headquarters in North Carolina.

References

External links 

Sportswear brands
Clothing brands of the United States
Clothing companies established in 1946
Companies based in North Carolina
Fayetteville, North Carolina
1960s fashion
1970s fashion
1980s fashion
1990s fashion
2000s fashion
2010s fashion
1946 establishments in North Carolina